Virginia District Court may refer to:

 Virginia General District Court
 United States District Court for the Eastern District of Virginia
 United States District Court for the Western District of Virginia
 United States District Court for the District of Virginia, a former United States district court